Banks Lake South is a census-designated place (CDP) in Grant County, Washington, United States. The population was 174 at the 2010 census.

Geography
Banks Lake South is located in northern Grant County at  (47.630298, -119.274900), adjacent to the eastern border of Coulee City. It is on the east side of Banks Lake near its southern end, part of the Upper Grand Coulee valley.

U.S. Route 2 passes through the CDP, leading east  to Wilbur and west  to Wenatchee. Washington State Route 155 leads northeast from Banks Lake  to the city of Grand Coulee near the Grand Coulee Dam.

Demographics
As of the census of 2000, there were 160 people, 75 households, and 53 families residing in the CDP. The population density was 65.7 people per square mile (25.3/km2). There were 86 housing units at an average density of 35.3/sq mi (13.6/km2). The racial makeup of the CDP was 99.38% White, and 0.62% from two or more races.

There were 75 households, out of which 21.3% had children under the age of 18 living with them, 65.3% were married couples living together, 4.0% had a female householder with no husband present, and 29.3% were non-families. 26.7% of all households were made up of individuals, and 6.7% had someone living alone who was 65 years of age or older. The average household size was 2.13 and the average family size was 2.57.

In the CDP, the age distribution of the population shows 16.3% under the age of 18, 4.4% from 18 to 24, 18.8% from 25 to 44, 41.9% from 45 to 64, and 18.8% who were 65 years of age or older. The median age was 53 years. For every 100 females, there were 105.1 males. For every 100 females age 18 and over, there were 103.0 males.

The median income for a household in the CDP was $37,500, and the median income for a family was $38,750. Males had a median income of $34,375 versus $28,750 for females. The per capita income for the CDP was $18,588. About 4.3% of families and 8.7% of the population were below the poverty line, including 14.3% of those under the age of eighteen and 8.8% of those 65 or over.

References

Census-designated places in Grant County, Washington
Census-designated places in Washington (state)